This is a list of episodes for the BBC Scotland show videoGaiden, an entertainment show with a magazine format, dedicated to video game reviews, gaming features, and comedy sketches based on gaming culture. The show's format was adapted from the internet television show Consolevania, featuring the same lead presenters and some of the same supporting cast. Production of the two shows overlapped during their initial period of production in 2005–08.

The first series of videoGaiden was broadcast in late 2005 and the second in late 2006. The main run of the third series (2007–08) was released online, with three TV specials. The show was cancelled following the third series, but returned for a run of six online episodes and one TV special in early 2016. No further episodes have yet been commissioned.

33 episodes were produced during the show's original 2005–08 run, while a further 7 episodes were produced in 2016, making a total of 40.

Series overview

Episodes

Series One (2005)

The first series of videoGaiden was broadcast on BBC Two Scotland.

Series Two (2006)

The second series of videoGaiden was broadcast on BBC Two Scotland.

Series Three (2007-08)

The third series of videoGaiden was announced on 14 October 2007.
In addition to the main series comprising 18 episodes, which was released online via the show's site on BBC Online, three specials were also broadcast on BBC Two Scotland.

Series Three TV Specials

Series Four (2016)

Episodes were released simultaneously on the BBC iPlayer and on BBC Scotland's YouTube channel. The TV Special was broadcast on BBC2 Scotland.

Series Four TV Special

References

Lists of British non-fiction television series episodes